Shenbaga also known as Shenbagam is an Indian actress in Tamil and Malayalam films. She was one of the prominent lead and supporting actress in Tamil and Malayalam films from 1991 to 1996.

Filmography

References

External links

Actresses from Tamil Nadu
Actresses in Malayalam cinema
Indian film actresses
Actresses in Tamil cinema
Living people
Year of birth missing (living people)
People from Thoothukudi district
20th-century Indian actresses